Adrian Mifsud (born 11 December 1974 in Rabat, Malta) is a professional footballer currently playing for Maltese Second Division side Rabat Ajax, where he plays as a striker.

External links

 Adrian Mifsud at MaltaFootball.com
 

Living people
1974 births
Maltese footballers
Rabat Ajax F.C. players
Hibernians F.C. players
Sliema Wanderers F.C. players
Floriana F.C. players
Association football forwards
Malta international footballers